Love, Rosie may refer to:
 Love, Rosie, the US title of Where Rainbows End, a 2004 novel by Cecelia Ahern
 Love, Rosie (film), a 2014 British-German film by Christian Ditter based on the book